The Free World is a propaganda term, primarily used during the Cold War from 1945 to 1991, to refer to the Western Bloc and aligned countries.

The term refers more broadly to all liberal democracies collectively, as opposed to authoritarian regimes such as communist states. It has traditionally primarily been used to refer to the countries allied and aligned with the United States, the European Union and NATO. The term "leader of the free world" has been used to imply a symbolic and moral leadership, and was mostly used during the Cold War in reference to the president of the United States.

History of the concept

Origins

During World War II, the Allied powers viewed themselves as opposing the oppression and fascism of the Axis powers, thus making them "free". Following the end of World War II, the Cold War conception of the "Free World" included only anti-Soviet states as being "free", particularly democratically elected states with free speech, a free press, freedom of assembly and freedom of association.

During the Cold War, many neutral countries, either those in what is considered the Third World, or those having no formal alliance with either the United States or the Soviet Union, viewed the claim of "Free World" leadership by the United States as grandiose and illegitimate.

One of the earliest uses of the term Free World as a politically significant term occurs in Frank Capra's World War II propaganda film series Why We Fight. In Prelude to War, the first film of that series, the "free world" is portrayed as a white planet, directly contrasted with the black planet called the "slave world". The film depicts the free world as the Western Hemisphere, led by the United States and Western Europe, and the slave world as the Eastern Hemisphere, dominated by Nazi Germany, Fascist Italy and the Japanese Empire.

21st century usage
While "Free World" had its origins in the Cold War, the phrase is still used after the end of the Cold War and during the Global War on Terrorism. Samuel P. Huntington said the term has been replaced by the concept of the international community, which, he argued, "has become the euphemistic collective noun (replacing "the Free World") to give global legitimacy to actions reflecting the interests of the United States and other Western powers."

Leadership of the Free World

United States

The "Leader of the Free World" was a colloquialism, first used during the Cold War, to describe either the United States or, more commonly, the President of the United States. The term when used in this context suggested that the United States was the principal democratic superpower, and the US president was by extension the leader of the world's democratic states, i.e. the "Free World".

The phrase has its origin in the 1940s during the Second World War, especially through the anti-fascist Free World magazine and the US propaganda film series Why We Fight. At this time, the term was criticized for including the Soviet Union (USSR), which critics saw as a totalitarian dictatorship. However, the term became more widely used against the USSR and its allies during the 1950s in the Cold War era, when the US depicted a foreign policy based on a struggle between "a democratic alliance and a communist realm set on world domination", according to The Atlantic. The term here was criticised again for including right-wing dictatorships such as Francoist Spain, and Nikita Khrushchev said in the 21st Congress of the Soviet Communist Party that "the so-called free world constitutes the kingdom of the dollar".

Although in decline after the mid-1970s, the term was heavily referenced in US foreign policy up until the dissolution of the Soviet Union in December 1991. After the presidency of George H. W. Bush the term has largely fallen out of use, in part for its usage in rhetoric critical of US policy.

Terms implying a leadership role in the "free world" later came to be used for other persons, places, or states.

European Union 
On 6 May 2010, upon an address to the plenary chamber of the European Parliament, the then US Vice President Joe Biden, stated that Brussels had a "legitimate claim" to the title of "capital of the free world", normally a title reserved for Washington. He added that Brussels is a "great city which boasts 1,000 years of history and serves as capital of Belgium, the home of many of the institutions of the European Union and the headquarters of the NATO alliance."

Germany 

When Time declared the German Chancellor Angela Merkel Time Person of the Year for 2015, they referred to her as "Europe's most powerful leader", and the cover bore the title "Chancellor of the Free World". 
Following the election of Donald Trump to the US presidency in November 2016, The New York Times called Merkel "the Liberal West's Last Defender", and a number of commentators called her "the next leader of the free world". Merkel herself rejected the description. An article by James Rubin in Politico about a White House meeting between Merkel and Trump was, ironically titled "The Leader of the Free World Meets Donald Trump".

German commentators agreed with Merkel's assessment, and Friedrich Merz, a CDU politician, said that a German chancellor could never be "leader of the free world". In April 2017, columnist James Kirchick stressed the importance of the German elections (on which "the future of the free world" depended) since America had "abdicated its traditional role as leader of the free world by electing Trump, the United Kingdom was turning inward after the referendum decision to leave the European Union, and France was also traditionally unilateralist and now had an inexperienced president"; he called Merkel "something less than leader of the free world ... but something greater than the leader of just another random country". References to America's abdication of its role as leader of the free world continued or increased after Donald Trump questioned the unconditional defence of NATO partners and the Paris climate accord.

Jagoda Marinić, writing for The New York Times, noted that "Barack Obama all but literally passed on the mantle of 'leader of the free world' to Ms. Merkel (and not Mr. Trump), and most Germans feel empowered by that new responsibility" and that Germany "is coming to understand its role in standing up for liberal democracy in a world turning more and more authoritarian."

Other commentators—in the United States and Europe—rejected the appellation "Leader of the Free World": some argued that there is no single leader of the 'free world'; others queried whether Merkel remained the "leader of the free world" and the champion of liberal values. Questioned about Merkel's standing following her performance in the German elections in September 2017, former US Secretary of State Hillary Clinton opined that Merkel was "the most important leader in the free world". However, after Merkel's party suffered losses in the 2017 election and there were delays in forming a government, the claim that Merkel is the true leader of the free world was referred to as a "joke", described as a media phenomenon, and otherwise called into question.

When Merkel retired as Chancellor, Hillary Clinton wrote that "she led Europe through difficult times with steadiness and bravery, and for four long years, she was the leader of the free world."

See also
 New world order (politics)
 Freedom in the World

References

Political terminology of the United States
Cold War terminology
Democracy
Political terminology
20th-century neologisms
Propaganda in the United States